Odayil Ninnu is a Malayalam novel written by Indian author P. Kesavadev in 1942. The protagonist of the novel is a rickshaw-puller named Pappu. The novel is one of the best-known works of Kesavadev. Dev was in the forefront among the writers who employed new norms in the content and characterization in Malayalam fiction. Odayil Ninnu came as a shocking revelation that the finest piece of literature can be produced with commonplace themes and unconventional style of prose with ordinary mortals as heroes and heroines. Apart from the fact that the appearance of the rickshaw puller was a thrilling experience at that time, the author blazed a new trail in Malayalam literature. With the appearance of the novel in 1942 began the publication of a series of high-quality novels in Malayalam.

Main character
Pappu - the protagonist, a real rebel and influencer always fight for equality and justice. He fought against landlordism from childhood onwards.

Film adaptations
 Odayil Ninnu (Malayalam, 1965): Directed by K. S. Sethumadhavan from a screenplay by P. Kesavadev.
 Babu (Tamil, 1971): Directed by A. C. Trilokchandar.
Marapurani Manishi (Telugu, 1973): Directed by T. Rama Rao
 Babu (Hindi, 1985): Directed by A. C. Trilokchandar.

References

External links
 A write-up on the novel

1942 novels
20th-century Indian novels
Malayalam novels
Indian novels adapted into films
Novels set in India